Thalika Gunaratne (born 9 March 1975) is a Sri Lankan former cricketer. She played thirteen Women's One Day International matches for Sri Lanka women's national cricket team. She was part of Sri Lanka's squad for the 2005 Women's Cricket World Cup.

References

External links
 

1975 births
Living people
Sri Lankan women cricketers
Sri Lanka women One Day International cricketers
People from Anuradhapura